List by Family Name: A - B - C - D - E - F - G - H - I - J - K - M - N - O - R - S - T - U - W - Y - Z

 Abe Akira (1934–1989)
 Abe Kobo (1924–1993)
 Abe Kazushige (born 1968)
 Abe no Nakamaro (698–770)
 Abe Tomoji (1903–1973)
 Aeba Koson (August 15, 1855 – June 20, 1922)
 Agawa Hiroyuki (1920–2015)
 Aikawa Sho (born 1965)
 Aizu Yaichi (August 1, 1881 – November 21, 1956)
 Akae Baku (1933–2012)
 Akagawa Jiro (born 1948)
 Akahori Satoru (born 1965)
 Akazome Emon (956–1041)
 Akiyama Mizuhito (born 1971)
 Akiyuki Nosaka (October 10, 1930 – December 9, 2015)
 Akutagawa Ryūnosuke (March 1, 1892 – July 24, 1927)
 Anrakuan Sakuden (1544–1642)
 Anzai Atsuko (born 1929)
 Anzai Fuyue (March 9, 1898 – August 24, 1965)
 Arai Hakuseki (1657–1725)
 Arai Motoko (born 1960)
 Araki Toichiro (1895–1977)
 Arishima Ikuma (November 26, 1882 – September 15, 1960)
 Arishima Takeo (March 4, 1878 – June 9, 1923)
 Ariyoshi Sawako (January 20, 1931 – August 30, 1984)
 Asada Jiro (born 1951)
 Ashibe Taku (born 1958)
 Asai Ryoi (died 1691)
 Ayatsuji Yukito (born 1960)
 Ayukawa Tetsuya (1919–2002)

A